Futari may refer to:
Futari (album), an album by Miwako Okuda
"Futari" (song), a song by Jun Shibata
Futari (magazine), a Finnish magazine
Futari (people), a South American tribe